Noah's Ark is a children's picture book written and illustrated by Peter Spier, first published by Doubleday in 1977. The text includes Spier's translation of "The Flood" by Jacobus Revius, a 17th-century poem telling the Bible story of Noah's Ark. According to Kirkus Reviews, the poem comprises sixty three-syllable lines such as "Pair by pair" (in translation). "Without revising or even enlarging on the old story, Spier fills it in, delightfully." In a retrospective essay about the Caldecott Medal-winning books from 1976 to 1985, Barbara Bader described the book as "at once elaborate and feeble" and Revius' poem as "neither particularly suited to children nor eloquent in itself."

For Noah's Ark Spier won the 1978 Caldecott Medal for illustration 
and the 1982 National Book Award for Children's Books in category Picture Books (paperback).

Notes

References

American children's books
American picture books
Caldecott Medal–winning works
National Book Award for Young People's Literature winning works
1977 children's books
Doubleday (publisher) books
Noah's Ark in fiction
Cattle in literature
Books about dogs
Books about elephants
Books about lions
Horses in literature
Books about pigs